Evergestis forficalis, the garden pebble, is a species of moth of the family Crambidae. It is found in Europe, the Palearctic and North America. The species was described by Carl Linnaeus in his 1758  10th edition of Systema Naturae

The species closely resembles Rivula sericealis.
The wingspan is 25–28 mm. The forewings are whitish-ochreous, disc and apex sometimes tinged with yellowish-brown ; lines fine, dark brown, very obliquely curved, indented beneath costa,first very indistinct towards costa ; two small transversely placed discal spots outlined with dark fuscous, lower larger ; a dark fuscous oblique apical streak ; margins of subterminal line obscurely brownish. The hindwings are ochreous- whitish with a grey posterior line.
The larva is yellowish-green ; dorsal and lateral lines darker green ; head yellowish

The length of the forewings 12–14 mm. The moth flies from May to September depending on the location.

The larvae feed on Brassicaceae species, such as Brussels sprout and kale.

References

External links
"63.057 BF1356 Garden Pebble Evergestis forficalis (Linnaeus, 1758)". UKMoths. - with pictures
Lepidoptera of Belgium
Lepiforum.de

Evergestis
Moths described in 1758
Moths of Asia
Moths of Europe
Moths of North America
Taxa named by Carl Linnaeus